Pieces of a Man is the second solo studio album by American rapper AZ. It was released on April 7, 1998 via Noo Trybe Records. Production was handled by Trackmasters, Goldfinga, Gucci Jones, L.E.S., Kenny Kornegay, Nashiem Myrick, RZA and Tony Dofat. It features guest appearances from The Firm, Half-A-Mil, Monifah, RZA and Panama P.I. The album peaked at No. 22 on the Billboard 200 and at No. 5 on the Top R&B/Hip-Hop Albums in the United States.

The album was highly praised for its complex and insightful lyricism. The first single was intended to be "Hey AZ" featuring SWV, which peaked at No. 50 on the Hot R&B/Hip-Hop Songs. Music video for "Hey AZ" was shot, but the song was included only in the Japanese edition of the project.

Track listing

Sample credits
Track 1 contains a sample from "Feeling Good" by Nina Simone, and a sample from "Happy Birthday Maggie" by Hans Zimmer.
Track 3 contains a sample from "Show Me" by Glenn Jones.
Track 7 contains samples from "Like a Tattoo" by Sade.
Track 8 contains a sample of the recording "The Glow of Love" by Change.
Track 18 contains a sample from "Hey DJ" as performed by The World's Famous Supreme Team.

Charts

References

External links

1998 albums
AZ (rapper) albums
Mafioso rap albums
Albums produced by RZA
Albums produced by Trackmasters
Albums produced by L.E.S. (record producer)